Craig Brian Sarner (born June 20, 1949 in St. Paul, Minnesota) is a retired American ice hockey forward who appeared in a total of 7 National Hockey League regular season games with the Boston Bruins in 1974–75. He also played briefly for the WHA Minnesota Fighting Saints 1976 before moving to Europe where he was a top scorer in Germany and Switzerland. He retired from hockey after the 1980–81 season.

Before turning professional, Sarner played for the United States national team at the 1972 Winter Olympics. He also played at the 1972, 1976, 1979 World Championships.

Career statistics

Regular season and playoffs

International

References
 

1949 births
Living people
American expatriate sportspeople in Switzerland
American men's ice hockey forwards
Berliner SC players
Boston Braves (AHL) players
Boston Bruins players
HC Davos players
Ice hockey people from Saint Paul, Minnesota
Ice hockey players at the 1972 Winter Olympics
Medalists at the 1972 Winter Olympics
Minnesota Fighting Saints players
Minnesota Golden Gophers men's ice hockey players
Oklahoma City Blazers (1965–1977) players
Olympic silver medalists for the United States in ice hockey
Rochester Americans players
Undrafted National Hockey League players